Vincent Omumbo (born 2 February 1990) is a Kenyan professional footballer who plays as a midfielder.

External links 
 

1994 births
Living people
Kenyan footballers

Association football midfielders
Kenya international footballers